Antonia Florence Ridge (7 October 1895 – 18 June 1981) was a Dutch-born writer and broadcaster, who wrote the English lyrics for Friedrich-Wilhelm Möller's popular song, "The Happy Wanderer" (originally "" or ""), and others of his works.

She wrote fiction and non-fiction, for adults and children. She scripted and read plays for BBC Radio's Children's Hour. Her non-fiction works include a biography of the botanical artist, Pierre-Joseph Redouté, and For Love of a Rose, a biography of the rose-growing Meilland family. Some of her works were collaborations with the Dutch author .

She appeared as a castaway on the BBC Radio programme Desert Island Discs on 25 January 1960.

Bibliography

With Mies Bouhuys

References 

1895 births
1981 deaths
Place of death missing
Dutch writers
Dutch emigrants to the United Kingdom